was a Rinzai Zen Buddhist monk of the Ryukyu Kingdom.

Kikuin was ordained as a Bhikkhu (full monk) at the Enkaku-ji temple in Shuri. Later, he travelled to Japan to study Zen for over ten years. After he returned to Ryukyu, he was appointed abbot of Tennō-ji temple. Kikuin was fluent in Japanese; he was friends of Shimazu Yoshihisa, Shimazu Yoshihiro and Shimazu Iehisa. He led missions to Satsuma Domain multiple times.

In the spring of 1609, Satsuma invaded Ryukyu and captured the strategically important Nakijin Castle. Kikuin went there to request a peace negotiation together with a Japanese tea master named Kian, but they were arrested by Satsuma troops. After the war, he was taken to Kagoshima Castle together with King Shō Nei and a number of high officials by Satsuma troops. After sessei Gushichan Chōsei died at Sunpu Castle, he served as acting sessei.

1620 deaths
People of the Ryukyu Kingdom
16th-century Ryukyuan people
17th-century Ryukyuan people
Rinzai Buddhists
Zen Buddhist abbots
Sessei
Buddhism in the Ryukyu Islands